Carlo Galli may refer to:

 Carlo Galli (footballer) (born 1931), Italian footballer
 Carlo Galli (political scientist) (born 1950), Italian political scientist 
 Carlo Galli (diplomat) (1878–1966), Italian diplomat